European Film Award for Best Comedy has been awarded annually since 2013 by the European Film Academy.

Winners and nominees

2010s

2020s

See also 
 Golden Globe Award for Best Motion Picture – Musical or Comedy
 Critics' Choice Movie Award for Best Comedy
 Empire Award for Best Comedy

References

External links
 Nominees and winners at the European Film Academy website

Comedy
Awards for best film
Awards established in 2013
2013 establishments in Europe